Trichloroacetyl chloride is the acyl chloride of trichloroacetic acid.  It can be formed by reacting chlorine with acetyl chloride or acetaldehyde in the presence of activated charcoal.  It is used in the manufacture of pharmaceuticals and plant protection compounds.

References

Acyl chlorides
Trichloromethyl compounds